Pottas Bomb is a 2013 Indian Malayalam-language drama film written and directed by Suresh Achoos.

Plot 

The film narrates the story of four boys who ran away from a juvenile home and get involved in a murder.

Cast 
 Vishnu Unnikrishnan as Musthafa
 Mohith Sharma as Balu
Anu Sithara as Aswathy
 Tini Tom as CI Santhosh Kumar.
 Priyanka as CI Santhosh Kumar's friend.(a social activist & writer)
 Indrans as Rayappan.
 Irshad as Babby Thomas
 Kottayam Naseer as PA Mohanan.

References

 

2010s Malayalam-language films
Indian drama films